Moyers may refer to the following:
 Moyers, Oklahoma
 Moyers, West Virginia

People with the surname Moyers
 Bill Moyers (born 1934), American journalist and public commentator
 Edward L. Moyers (1928–2006), American railroad executive
 Kevin Moyers (born 1976), American author
 Robert Moyers (1919–1996), American orthodontist
 Steve Moyers (born 1956), American soccer forward

See also
 Moyer, surname